Bad Internet is an American series that premiered on May 25, 2016, on YouTube Premium (then known as YouTube Red). It is produced by CollegeHumor's Los Angeles-based production studio Big Breakfast. The first season contains ten episodes, with only the first—"Which of the 'Friends' are You?"—available to view on YouTube without a YouTube Premium subscription. As of November 2021, it has also been released on Dropout, CollegeHumor's streaming platform. The series was inspired by Charlie Brooker's technology-centered anthology TV show Black Mirror. Sam Reich, CollegeHumor's head of video, said that in creating the series, he wanted to do a project that was both ambitious and true to CollegeHumor's slacker humor heritage. Reich also told Mashable that Bad Internet was "a series built for the Internet."

Cast
The cast on the show included Los Angeles based sketch comedians like Zac Oyama, Siobhan Thompson, Mike Trapp, Emily Axford, and Colton Dunn who are regulars in CollegeHumor content, alongside YouTube celebrities, including Justine Ezarik, Rosanna Pansino, Jordan Maron, Ian Hecox, and Anthony Padilla, and mainstream comedians and character actors like Jack McBrayer, Will Arnett, Jean Smart, Cheri Oteri, Maribeth Monroe, Oscar Nunez, Matt McCarthy, John Milhiser, Larry Hankin, Mary Holland, Stephen Tobolowsky, Mindy Sterling, Ed Begley Jr., and George Wyner.

Episodes

Reception
Marissa Martinelli of Slate described the series as "very funny stuff", noting the clear parallels it contained to Black Mirror and Divergent.

Nominations and awards

References

2016 web series debuts
CollegeHumor
YouTube Premium original series
2016 American television series debuts
2016 American television series endings